Ana Margot Lemos (born April 24, 1986) is a female weightlifter from Colombia. She won a silver medal at the 2007 Pan American Games for her native South American country.

References
 Ana LEMOS MARGOT at The-Sports.org
 Ana Margot LEMOS at NBC's 2008 Olympics website

1986 births
Living people
Colombian female weightlifters
Weightlifters at the 2007 Pan American Games
Pan American Games silver medalists for Colombia
Female powerlifters
Pan American Games medalists in weightlifting
Central American and Caribbean Games gold medalists for Colombia
Competitors at the 2006 Central American and Caribbean Games
Central American and Caribbean Games medalists in weightlifting
Medalists at the 2007 Pan American Games
Pan American Weightlifting Championships medalists
21st-century Colombian women